An Achilles' heel (or Achilles heel) is a weakness in spite of overall strength, which can lead to downfall. While the mythological origin refers to a physical vulnerability, idiomatic references to other attributes or qualities that can lead to downfall are common.

Origin 
In Greek mythology, when Achilles was an infant, it was foretold that he would perish at a young age. To prevent his death, his mother Thetis took Achilles to the River Styx, which was supposed to offer powers of invulnerability. She dipped his body into the water but, because she held him by his heel, it was not touched by the water of the river. Achilles grew up to be a man of war who survived many great battles.

Although the death of Achilles was predicted by Hector in Homer’s Iliad, it does not actually occur in the Iliad, but it is described in later Greek and Roman poetry and drama concerning events after the Iliad, later in the Trojan War. In the myths surrounding the war, Achilles was said to have died from a wound to his heel, ankle, or torso, which was the result of an arrow—possibly poisoned—shot by Paris. The Iliad may purposefully suppress the myth to emphasise Achilles' human mortality and the stark chasm between gods and heroes.

Classical myths attribute Achilles's invulnerability to his mother Thetis having treated him with ambrosia and burned away his mortality in the hearth fire except on the heel, by which she held him. Peleus, his father, discovered the treatment and was alarmed to see Thetis holding the baby in the flames, which offended him and made her leave the treatment incomplete. According to a myth arising later, his mother had dipped the infant Achilles in the river Styx, holding onto him by his heel, and he became invulnerable where the waters touched him—that is, everywhere except the areas of his heel that were covered by her thumb and forefinger.

As expression
As an expression meaning "area of weakness, vulnerable spot," the use of "Achilles' heel" dates only to 1840, with implied use in Samuel Taylor Coleridge's "Ireland, that vulnerable heel of the British Achilles!" from 1810 (Oxford English Dictionary).

Anatomy
The oldest-known written record of the Achilles tendon being named after Achilles is in 1693 by the Flemish/Dutch anatomist Philip Verheyen. In his widely used text Corporis Humani Anatomia he described the tendon's location and said that it was commonly called "the cord of Achilles."

The large and prominent tendon of the gastrocnemius, soleus, and plantaris muscles of the calf is called the tendo achilleus or Achilles tendon. This is commonly associated with the site of Achilles's death wound. Tendons are avascular, so such an injury would be unlikely to be fatal if the arrow were not poisoned.

See also

 in Norse mythology
Duryodhana in the Mahabharatha
 in the Shahnameh

 in the Nibelungenlied

References 

Idioms
Achilles